Events in the year 1991 in Portugal.

Incumbents
President: Mário Soares
Prime Minister: Aníbal Cavaco Silva

Events

January
 13 January – 1991 Portuguese presidential election: President Mário Soares (in office since 1986) is re-elected for a second term with more than 70% of the votes. He was supported by PS and PSD, the two major parties in Portugal.

March
7 March – Dulce Pontes wins the 1991 Festival RTP da Canção, with the song Lusitana paixão. Dulce Pontes thus became the representative of Portugal at the 1991 Eurovision Song Contest.
9 March – Mário Soares takes the oath of office for a second term as President of Portugal.

May
10–13 May – Pope John Paul II visits Portugal. The Pope visited Lisbon, Fátima, the Azores and Funchal.
31 May – Bicesse Accords are signed.

June
4 June – The Assembly of the Republic approves the 1990 Orthographic Agreement.
14 June – Opening of 1991 FIFA World Youth Championship. The tournament was hosted by Portugal and was played across 5 cities. Portugal U-20 team were the defending champions.
24 June – São João Bridge is opened.
30 June – Portugal wins the 1991 FIFA World Youth Championship, defeating Brazil in a final played at Estádio da Luz, in Lisbon. Portugal thus renewed the title they had conquered in the previous Championship, held in 1989. Many of the players of the victorious 1989 and 1991 youth squads (such as Luís Figo, Rui Costa and Fernando Couto) would later become the Golden Generation of the Portuguese senior team, a generation which would reach the semifinals of UEFA Euro 2000, the final of UEFA Euro 2004 and the semifinals of 2006 FIFA World Cup.

September
13 September – Lisbon–Oporto motorway is completed.

October
 6 October - 1991 Portuguese legislative election: Led by Aníbal Cavaco Silva, the incumbent centre-right PSD wins an historical absolute majority, renewing the majority they had conquered in the 1987 election. Prime Minister Cavaco Silva (in office since 1985) is appointed for a third term in office.

Arts and entertainment
Portugal participated in the Eurovision Song Contest 1991 with Dulce Pontes and the song "Lusitana paixão".

Sports
In association football, for the first-tier league seasons, see 1990–91 Primeira Divisão and 1991–92 Primeira Divisão; for the cup seasons, see 1990–91 Taça de Portugal and 1991–92 Taça de Portugal 
 2 June - Taça de Portugal Final
 14–30 June - FIFA World Youth Championship
 22 September  - Portuguese Grand Prix
 1–4 November - European Acrobatics Championships

Births
 29 January - Rafaël Dias, footballer
 5 February - Irina Rodrigues, discus thrower
 22 February - Joana Vasconcelos, sprint canoer
 5 March - Ruizinho, footballer
 20 April - Rui Caetano, footballer
 7 May - Evandro Brandão, footballer (born in Angola)
 16 May - Amido Baldé, footballer
 27 May - Mário Rui, footballer
 28 June - Tijane Reis, footballer (born in Guinea-Bissau)
 29 June - Júlio Regufe Alves, footballer
 1 July - Diogo Figueiras, footballer
 7 July - César André Costa Dias, futsal player
 21 July - Sara Sampaio, model
 31 July - Filipa Azevedo, singer
 7 August - Dolores Silva, footballer
 8 August - Nélson Oliveira, footballer
 31 August - António Félix da Costa, auto racing driver
 9 September - Danilo Pereira, footballer
 29 September - Pelé, footballer
 5 October - Renato Santos, footballer
 19 October - Flávio Ferreira, footballer
 11 November - Salvador Agra, footballer
 29 December - Lassana Camará, footballer

Deaths
 18 August - Luís Lindley Cintra, linguist
 10 September - António Reis, filmmaker, poet, sculptor, ethnographer

References

 
Portugal
Years of the 20th century in Portugal
Portugal